Amaleh-ye Teymur (also Romanized as ‘Amaleh-ye Teymūr and  ‘Amaleh Teymūr; also known as Abūz̄ar-e Ghaffārī and ‘Omleh Teymūr) is a village in Hoseynabad Rural District, in the Central District of Shush County, Khuzestan Province, Iran. At the 2006 census, its population was 8,493, in 1,653 families.

References 

Populated places in Shush County